Avantirastra was one of the five original provinces of the Maurya Empire gained after the conquest of the Nanda Empire by Chandragupta Maurya. It was located in the modern-day Malwa region with its capital at Ujjain.

Ashoka served as viceroy of the region during his father Bindusara's reign.

References

Maurya Empire